Jawaharnagar is a city of  and a municipal corporation located in Medchal-Malkajgiri district in the Indian state of Telangana. It was upgraded to Municipal corporation in 2019. Previously, it was a part of Shamirpet mandal but now it falls under newly formed Kapra mandal.

GHMC dumpsite 
The Greater Hyderabad Municipal Corporation (GHMC) has its dumpsite located in this village over an area of approximately 350 acres and about 3500 metric tons of waste generated in the city of Hyderabad are disposed over here on a daily basis. New facilities for resource recovery from waste such as compost, recyclables, RDF (Refuse Derived Fuel)are being created under PPP (Public Private Partnership) through reclamation and remediation of dumpsite area.

Locality
It covers an area of 15,000 acres and is home to premier educational institutions like BITS Pilani Hyderabad Campus, Bio-Tech Park, Meditech Valley are all located here. XLRI is setting up its campus here on a 75-acre plot.
Jawahar nagar starts from ″Ambedkar Nagar″ ends at "Balaji Nagar".

References

External links 
 * Jawaharnagar Municipal Corporation
http://articles.timesofindia.indiatimes.com/2013-05-24/hyderabad/39501224_1_hyderabad-metropolitan-development-authority-jawaharnagar-area-land-allotment-policy 

Villages in Medchal–Malkajgiri district